Holmvatnet is a lake and a reservoir in the municipality of Rana in Nordland county, Norway.  It is located northeast of the villages of Mæla and Myklebustad.

The present lake was formed during the building of the Sjona hydroelectric power station during the early 1970s, when the original Holmvatnet was dammed and flowed together with the lake Nedre Fagervollvatnet further upstream.

See also
 List of lakes in Norway
 Geography of Norway

References

Lakes of Nordland
Rana, Norway